Thomas Atkinson may refer to:

Thomas Atkinson (architect) (1729–1798), British architect
Thomas Witlam Atkinson (1799–1861), British architect
Thomas Atkinson (bishop) (1807–1881), third Episcopal Bishop of the Diocese of North Carolina
Thomas Atkinson (priest) (died 1616), English Roman Catholic priest and martyr
Thomas Atkinson (Royal Navy officer) (1767–1836), Master of HMS Victory at the Battle of Trafalgar
Thomas Atkinson (divine) (1600–1639), English divine and dramatist
Thomas Atkinson (Wisconsin politician) (1928–1988), mayor of Green Bay, Wisconsin
Thomas Atkinson (poet) (1801–1833), Scottish poet and miscellaneous writer
Thomas E. Atkinson (1824–1868), American sailor and Medal of Honor recipient
Thomas Lewis Atkinson (1817–1898), English engraver
Thomas Robert Atkinson (1854–1921), lawyer and politician in Ontario, Canada
Thomas Atkinson (actor) (born 1998)
Thomas Atkinson (Australian politician) (1822–1906), politician in South Australia